The 1982–83 IHL season was the 38th season of the International Hockey League, a North American minor professional league. Eight teams participated in the regular season, and the Toledo Goaldiggers won the Turner Cup.

Regular season

Turner Cup playoffs

External links
 Season 1982/83 on hockeydb.com

IHL
International Hockey League (1945–2001) seasons